Samalan Island is a small island, just off the Isle of Mull at the mouth of Loch na Keal in the Inner Hebrides, Scotland. To its south west is the island of Inchkenneth, and to its north, the island of Ulva.

It is a low-lying island, and does not rise above  at its highest point. It is uninhabited, and shows no signs of permanent inhabitation.

Footnotes

 

Islands of the Inner Hebrides
Uninhabited islands of Argyll and Bute